Grugny is a commune in the Seine-Maritime department in the Normandy region in northern France.

Geography
The A29 autoroute passes through the northern section of the commune's territory.

Population

Places of interest
 The church of St.Avoye, dating from the thirteenth century.
 The manor house at Bosc-Folenfant.

See also
Communes of the Seine-Maritime department

References

External links

Website of the village of Grugny 

Communes of Seine-Maritime